Pseudobeta seabrai is a species of beetle in the family Cerambycidae. It was described by Monné and Fragoso in 1984. It is known from Brazil.

References

Onciderini
Beetles described in 1984